Xandarella is an extinct genus of xandarellid artiopodan known from the Cambrian of China and Morocco, the type species Xandarella spectaculum was described in 1991 from the Cambrian Stage 3 aged Chengjiang Biota in China. An additional species Xandarella mauretanica was described from the Cambrian Stage 5 Tatelt Formation in Morocco in 2017, which preserved only the ventral anatomy. Like other Xandarellids, the exoskeleton is unmineralised. The cephalon has pronounced eye slits, presumably derived from ancestral ventral stalked eyes.

References

Fossil taxa described in 1991
Artiopoda